Goodbye Again (released in Europe as Aimez-vous Brahms?) is a 1961 American-French romantic drama film produced and directed by Anatole Litvak. The screenplay was written by Samuel A. Taylor, based on the novel Aimez-vous Brahms? by Françoise Sagan.  The film, released by United Artists, stars Ingrid Bergman, Anthony Perkins, Yves Montand, and Jessie Royce Landis.

Plot
Paula Tessier is a 40-year-old interior designer who for the past five years has been the mistress of Roger Demarest, a "philandering business executive" who refuses to stop seeing other women. When Paula meets Philip, the 25-year-old son of one of her wealthy clients, he falls in love with her and insists that the age difference will not matter. Paula resists the young man's advances, but finally succumbs when Roger initiates yet another affair with one of his young "Maisies". While she is initially happy with Philip, her friends and business associates disapprove of the May–December romance.  By the time of the ending, the plot has undergone a triple reversal that thrusts one of life's wry ironies up the nose of the viewer.

Cast

 Ingrid Bergman as Paula Tessier
 Yves Montand as Roger Demarest
 Anthony Perkins as Philip Van der Besh
 Jessie Royce Landis as Mrs. Van der Besh
 Pierre Dux as Maitre Fleury
 Jackie Lane as First Maisie
 Jean Clarke as Second Maisie
 Michèle Mercier as Third Maisie
 Uta Taeger as Gaby
 André Randall as Mr. Steiner
 Peter Bull as Client
 Alison Leggatt as Alice
 David Horne as Queen's Counsel
 Diahann Carroll as Night Club Singer
Uncredited Cast
 Lee Patrick as Mme. Fleury
 Annie Duperoux as Madeline Fleury
 Raymond Gerome as Jimmy
 Jean Hebey as Mons. Cherel
 Michel Garland as Young Man in Club
 Colin Mann as Assistant Lawyer

The cast includes brief, uncredited cameo appearances by Yul Brynner and  Jean-Pierre Cassel.

Production
Litvak and others thought "Aimez-vous Brahms?" would be a confusing title for U.S. audiences, and initially chose Time on My Hands as the title for the American release, after the song of that name they had selected as the main theme; when the song's publishers insisted on a $75,000 license for its use, they dropped plans to use the song, and the production team settled on "Goodbye Again" as the title, a suggestion from Perkins that he had taken from a Broadway production in which his father Osgood had had a role.

Scenes were filmed on location in Paris.  During principal photography, Perkins thought Bergman was a "little too persistent" in her attempts to get him to rehearse their kissing scenes; Perkins later said "Bergman would have welcomed an affair with him", but Bergman had a different explanation in her 1980 autobiography, saying it was her shyness and tendency to blush: "You see, although the camera has no terrors at all for me, I'm very bad at this sort of intimacy on the screen, especially when the men are practically strangers."

Uncredited "stars" of the film were the automobiles: as Time magazine pointed out, Goodbye Again "is thoroughly French. That is to say, all of its important scenes take place in restaurants or automobiles."

Music
The score is by Georges Auric, with additional music by Brahms.  The Brahms motifs are the 4th movement from Symphony No. 1 in C minor, Op. 68, and the 3rd Movement from Symphony No. 3 in F major, Op. 90. Film critic Bosley Crowther called the score "almost as elegant as the settings, which are the most respectable things in the film."

The soulful theme of the third movement of Brahms' Symphony No. 3 is heard repeatedly, including as the tune of a song ("Love Is Just a Word") sung by the night club singer (Diahann Carroll). Lyrics to the film are by Dory Langdon (later known as Dory Previn).

The soundtrack was released by United Artists Records (UAS 5091) in "electronic" (i.e., simulated) stereo.

Reception
The film "found success in Europe, where Perkins won an award at the Cannes Film Festival for his performance, but in America critics and audiences were generally unenthusiastic."  According to Bosley Crowther, "Taylor's derivative screen play has a few flights of fancy and wit, but on the whole it is solemn and pedestrian"; "Perkins not only has the most engaging role but he also plays it in the most engaging fashion and almost carries the picture by himself." Years later, Andrea Foshee, writing for Turner Classic Movies, agreed:

Co-star Anthony Perkins was just coming off his smash 1960 success as Norman Bates in Alfred Hitchcock's Psycho, a role that would typecast him for the rest of his career. Yet, as the charming, aimless Philip in Goodbye Again, Perkins clearly demonstrates his versatility as an actor in a role that couldn't be further removed from his turn as a cross-dressing schizophrenic killer.

Perkins won the Best Actor Award at the 1961 Cannes Film Festival and Anatole Litvak was nominated for the Palme d'Or.

It was the 25th most popular movie of the year in France.

See also
 List of American films of 1961

References

External links

Films based on French novels
American romantic drama films
1961 romantic drama films
Films shot in Paris
1961 films
United Artists films
American black-and-white films
Films based on works by Françoise Sagan
Films directed by Anatole Litvak
Sexuality and age in fiction
Films scored by Georges Auric
Johannes Brahms
1960s English-language films
1960s American films